Indecomposability or indecomposable may refer to any of several subjects in mathematics:

 Indecomposable module, in algebra
 Indecomposable distribution, in probability
 Indecomposable continuum, in topology
 Indecomposability (intuitionistic logic), a principle in constructive analysis and in computable analysis
 Indecomposability of a polynomial in polynomial decomposition
 A property of certain ordinals; see additively indecomposable ordinal